This is a list of wooden toys and games. A wooden toy is a toy constructed primarily from wood and wood products. Additional components made from other materials are also sometimes used.

Wooden toys

 Akabeko 
 Ball-in-a-maze puzzle 
 Bauernroulette
 Bead maze
 Bird of Happiness 
 Burr puzzle
 Channapatna toys 
 Chatter Telephone 
 Chinese yo-yo 
 Cup-and-ball 
 Dalecarlian horse 
 Dreidel 
 Etikoppaka toys – traditional wooden toys with lacquer colours made in Etikoppaka, AP, India. Some of the toy styles include Lord Ganesha toys, cannon toys and bullock carts. They are prepared using poniki wood.
 Froebel gifts 
 Gee-haw whammy diddle 
 Hobby horse 
 Hoop rolling 
 Jacob's ladder 
 Jig doll 
 Jigsaw puzzle 
 Jumping jack 
 Kapla 
 Kendama 
 KEVA Planks 
 Klotski 
 Kondapalli Toys 
 Lincoln Logs 
 Le Toy Van
 Matador 
 Matryoshka doll 
 Mechanical puzzle – some are constructed from wood and wood products
 Nirmal toys and craft 
 Peg wooden doll 
 Pinewood derby 
 Pyramid puzzle
 Rattleback 
 Reifendrehen 
 Rocking horse 
 Roly-poly toy 
 Snapper Puzzle 
 Soma cube
 Tender Leaf Toys
 Tinkertoy 
 Top 
 Toy block 
 Trompo 
 Unit block 
 Whittle Shortline 
 Wood car racing 
 Wooden toy train 
 Yo-yo – some yo-yos are made using wood

See also

 List of toys
 Wooden toymaking in the Ore Mountains

References

External links
 

Wooden toys
Lists of toys